In algebraic geometry, the moduli stack of rank-n vector bundles Vectn is the stack parametrizing vector bundles (or locally free sheaves) of rank n over some reasonable spaces.

It is a smooth algebraic stack of the negative dimension . Moreover, viewing a rank-n vector bundle as a principal -bundle, Vectn is isomorphic to the classifying stack

Definition 
For the base category, let C be the category of schemes of finite type over a fixed field k. Then  is the category where
 an object is a pair  of a scheme U in C and a rank-n vector bundle E over U

Let  be the forgetful functor. Via p,  is a prestack over C. That it is a stack over C is precisely the statement "vector bundles have the descent property". Note that each fiber  over U is the category of rank-n vector bundles over U where every morphism is an isomorphism (i.e., each fiber of p is a groupoid).

See also 
classifying stack
moduli stack of principal bundles

References 

Algebraic geometry